Li Yihong (born 9 July 1996) is an inactive Chinese tennis player.

Li, who has been more successful in doubles, has won nine doubles titles on the ITF Circuit. Her biggest win to date she realized at a $50k event in Tianjin, partnering Wang Yan, defeating Liu Wanting and Lu Jingjing in the final.

On 22 May 2017, Li achieved her career-high doubles ranking of world No. 286. On 27 April 2015, she peaked at No. 1203 of the WTA singles rankings.

ITF Circuit finals

Doubles: 16 (9 titles, 7 runner-ups)

External links
 
 

1996 births
Living people
Chinese female tennis players
People from Nanchong
Tennis players from Sichuan
21st-century Chinese women